Oeosporangium pteridioides (with many synonyms, including Hemionitis pteridioides) is a species of fern in the family Pteridaceae. Its native distribution is Macaronesia, around the Mediterranean in Europe, North Africa and Western Asia, and into the Sahara.

Subspecies
, the Checklist of Ferns and Lycophytes of the World recognized three subspecies:
Oeosporangium pteridioides subsp. pteridioides
Oeosporangium pteridioides subsp. reichsteinii Fraser-Jenk. & Pariyar
Oeosporangium pteridioides subsp. acrosticum (Balb.) Fraser-Jenk. & Pariyar, sometimes treated as a separate species (Oeosporangium acrosticum or Hemionitis acrostica)

References

Pteridaceae